Flok may refer to:
Chakhon Philakhlang (born 1998), Thai footballer (nickname: Flok)
flok (company), American company
A group of rebels in the Faroese folktale of Floksmenn

People
 First Lady of Kazakhstan (FLOK)

See also
Flik (disambiguation)
Flik and Flok (disambiguation)